Pieter Zeeman (25 May 1865 – 9 October 1943) was a Dutch physicist who shared the 1902 Nobel Prize in Physics with Hendrik Lorentz for his discovery of the Zeeman effect.

Childhood and youth
Pieter Zeeman was born in Zonnemaire, a small town on the island of Schouwen-Duiveland, Netherlands, the son of Rev Catharinus Forandinus Zeeman, a minister of the Dutch Reformed Church, and his wife, Willemina Worst.

Pieter became interested in physics at an early age. In 1883, the aurora borealis happened to be visible in the Netherlands. Zeeman, then a student at the high school in Zierikzee, made a drawing and description of the phenomenon and submitted it to Nature, where it was published. The editor praised "the careful observations of Professor Zeeman from his observatory in Zonnemaire".

After finishing high school in 1883, Zeeman went to Delft for supplementary education in classical languages, then a requirement for admission to University. He stayed at the home of Dr J.W. Lely, co-principal of the gymnasium and brother of Cornelis Lely, who was responsible for the concept and realization of the Zuiderzee Works. While in Delft, he first met Heike Kamerlingh Onnes, who was to become his thesis adviser.

Education and early career

After Zeeman passed the qualification exams in 1885, he studied physics at the University of Leiden under Kamerlingh Onnes and Hendrik Lorentz. In 1890, even before finishing his thesis, he became Lorentz's assistant. This allowed him to participate in a research programme on the Kerr effect. In 1893 he submitted his doctoral thesis on the Kerr effect, the reflection of polarized light on a magnetized surface. After obtaining his doctorate he went for half a year to Friedrich Kohlrausch's institute in Strasbourg. In 1895, after returning from Strasbourg, Zeeman became Privatdozent in mathematics and physics in Leiden. The same year he married Johanna Elisabeth Lebret (1873–1962); they had three daughters and one son.

In 1896, shortly before moving from Leiden to Amsterdam, he measured the splitting of spectral lines by a strong magnetic field, a discovery now known as the Zeeman effect, for which he won the 1902 Nobel Prize in Physics. This research involved an investigation of the effect of magnetic fields on a light source. He discovered that a spectral line is split into several components in the presence of a magnetic field. Lorentz first heard about Zeeman's observations on Saturday 31 October 1896 at the meeting of the Royal Netherlands Academy of Arts and Sciences in Amsterdam, where these results were communicated by Kamerlingh Onnes. The next Monday, Lorentz called Zeeman into his office and presented him with an explanation of his observations, based on Lorentz's theory of electromagnetic radiation.

The importance of Zeeman's discovery soon became apparent. It confirmed Lorentz's prediction about the polarization of light emitted in the presence of a magnetic field. Thanks to Zeeman's work it became clear that the oscillating particles that according to Lorentz were the source of light emission were negatively charged, and were a thousandfold lighter than the hydrogen atom. This conclusion was reached well before J. J. Thomson's discovery of the electron. The Zeeman effect thus became an important tool for elucidating the structure of the atom.

Professor in Amsterdam

Shortly after his discovery, Zeeman was offered a position as lecturer in Amsterdam, where he started to work in autumn of 1896. In 1900, this was followed by his promotion to professor of physics at the University of Amsterdam. In 1902, together with his former mentor Lorentz, he received the Nobel Prize for Physics for the discovery of the Zeeman effect. Five years later, in 1908, he succeeded Van der Waals as full professor and Director of the Physics Institute in Amsterdam.

In 1918 he published "Some experiments on gravitation: The ratio of mass to weight for crystals and radioactive substances" in the Proceedings of the Koninklijke Nederlandse Akademie van Wetenschappen, experimentally confirming the equivalence principle with regard to gravitational and inertial mass.

A new laboratory built in Amsterdam in 1923 was renamed the Zeeman Laboratory in 1940. This new facility allowed Zeeman to pursue refined investigation of the Zeeman effect. For the remainder of his career he remained interested in research in magneto-optic effects. He also investigated the propagation of light in moving media. This subject became the focus of a renewed interest because of special relativity, and enjoyed a keen interest from Lorentz and Einstein. Later in his career he became interested in mass spectrometry.

Later years
In 1898 Zeeman was elected to membership of the Royal Netherlands Academy of Arts and Sciences in Amsterdam, and he served as its secretary from 1912 to 1920. He won the Henry Draper Medal in 1921, and several other awards and Honorary degrees. Zeeman was elected a Foreign member of the Royal Society (ForMemRS) in 1921. He retired as a professor in 1935.

Zeeman died on 9 October 1943 in Amsterdam, and was buried in Haarlem.

Awards and honors
Zeeman received the following awards for his contributions.
 Nobel Prize for Physics (1902)
 Matteucci Medal (1912)
 Elected a Foreign Member of the Royal Society (ForMemRS) in 1921
 Henry Draper Medal from the National Academy of Sciences (1921)
 Rumford Medal (1922)
 Franklin Medal (1925)

The crater Zeeman on the Moon is named in his honour.

See also
 Atom and Atomic Theory
 Bohr–Sommerfeld model
 Fresnel drag coefficient
 Light-dragging effects

References

External links

 , available at Gallica. The "Address" of Gabriel Bertrand of December 20, 1943 at the French Academy: he gives biographical sketches of the lives of recently deceased members, including Pieter Zeeman, David Hilbert and Georges Giraud.
 Albert van Helden Pieter Zeeman 1865 – 1943 In: K. van Berkel, A. van Helden and L. Palm ed., A History of Science in The Netherlands. Survey, Themes and Reference (Leiden: Brill, 1999) 606 - 608.
 Biography at the Nobel e-museum and Nobel Lecture.
 
 P.F.A. Klinkenberg, Zeeman, Pieter (1865-1943), in Biografisch Woordenboek van Nederland.
 Biography of Pieter Zeeman (1865 – 1943) at the National library of the Netherlands.
  Anne J. Kox, Wetenschappelijke feiten en postmoderne fictie in de wetenschapsgeschiedenis, Inaugural lecture (1999).
 Pim de Bie, prof.dr. P. Zeeman Zonnemaire 25 mei 1865 - Amsterdam 9 oktober 1943 Gravesite of Pieter Zeeman
 Pieter Zeeman, Bijzondere collecties Leiden.
 photo & short info

1865 births
1943 deaths
20th-century Dutch physicists
19th-century Dutch physicists
Nobel laureates in Physics
Dutch Nobel laureates
Leiden University alumni
Academic staff of Leiden University
Academic staff of the University of Amsterdam
People from Zonnemaire
Quantum physicists
Foreign Members of the Royal Society
Members of the Royal Netherlands Academy of Arts and Sciences
Members of the Royal Academy of Belgium
Experimental physicists
Spectroscopists
Recipients of the Matteucci Medal